Lac d'Aubert is a lake in Hautes-Pyrénées, France. At an elevation of 2148 m, its surface area is 0.45 km².

Lakes of Hautes-Pyrénées